Sulpitus lilla is a species of beetle in the family Cerambycidae, and the only species in the genus Sulpitus. It was described by Dillon and Dillon in 1945.

References

Onciderini
Beetles described in 1945